Ḱojlija is a village in the municipality of Petrovec, North Macedonia.

Demographics
As of the 2021 census, Ḱojlija had 183 residents with the following ethnic composition:
Albanians 92
Bosniaks 42
Roma 27
Persons for whom data are taken from administrative sources 10
Macedonians 6
Others 6

According to the 2002 census, the village had a total of 400 inhabitants. Ethnic groups in the village include:
Bosniaks 215
Albanians 179
Macedonians 2
Romani 1
Others 3

References

External links

Villages in Petrovec Municipality
Albanian communities in North Macedonia